Mangalyasootram is a 1995 Indian Malayalam film, directed by Sajan and produced by P. T. Xavier. The film stars Jagathy Sreekumar, Kalpana, Murali and A. C. Zainuddin in the lead roles. The film has musical score by C. Rajamani and songs by Berny-Ignatius.

Cast
Jagathy Sreekumar as Pullepadi Dasan
Kalpana as Sumithra
Murali as Karnan
A. C. Zainuddin as Sujanan
Indrans as  Lorry Bhaskar
Kanaka as Indu
Kozhikode Narayanan Nair as Sukumaran Nair 
Shammi Thilakan as  Bhadran
Sonia as Nalini
Adoor Bhavani as  Narayaniyamma
Kuthiravattam Pappu as Achithan
Sreenath as Shivan
Usharani as Adv. Maheshwaryamma

Soundtrack
The music was composed by Berny-Ignatius and the lyrics were written by Gireesh Puthenchery.

References

External links
 

1995 films
1990s Malayalam-language films
Films directed by Sajan